Liberty High School is a public high school in Liberty, Illinois.

In 2005, Liberty High School had an average class size of 19 and a student:teacher ratio of 15.3.

References

External links
 Official School Web Page January 2007
Liberty High School at GreatSchools.net
Liberty School History

Public high schools in Illinois
Schools in Adams County, Illinois